The City of Hawthorn was a local government area about  east of Melbourne, the state capital of Victoria, Australia, on the southeast bank of the Yarra River.

History

Hawthorn was incorporated as a municipal district on 27 July 1860. It was proclaimed as a town on 18 March 1887, and a city on 12 September 1890.

On 22 June 1994, the City of Hawthorn was abolished, and along with the Cities of Camberwell and Kew, was merged into the newly created City of Boroondara.

The council met at the Hawthorn Town Hall, at the corner of Burwood and Glenferrie Roads, near Glenferrie railway station, Hawthorn. The facility is still used by the City of Boroondara as a regional arts centre.

Wards

The City of Hawthorn was divided into four wards in 1891, each electing three councillors:
 Auburn Ward
 Glenferrie Ward
 Power Ward
 Yarra Ward

Geography

The council area covered the suburbs of Hawthorn, Hawthorn East and parts of Glen Iris, and was bounded by the Yarra River to the west, Barkers Road to the north, Gardiners Creek and CityLink (formerly South Eastern Freeway) to the south and Burke Road to the east.

Population

* Estimate in the 1958 Victorian Year Book.

See also
 List of mayors of Hawthorn

References

External links
 Victorian Places - Hawthorn

Hawthorn
City of Boroondara
1994 disestablishments in Australia
1860 establishments in Australia